Aglais milberti, the fire-rim tortoiseshell or Milbert's tortoiseshell, is considered the only species of the proposed Aglais genus that occurs in North America.

Description

The wingspan is between 4.2 and 6.3 cm and the forewing's tips are squared off. The upperside is black with wide orange submarginal bands; this orange slightly fades to yellow near the inner edge. Both wings have narrow black marginal borders; the hindwing may have blue spots.

Behaviour
This is a quick species that flits rapidly around woodland roads. When it lands it may open its wings, often on trees or rocks.

Range and habitat
Milbert's tortoiseshell's range includes all of Canada and Alaska south of the tundra, all of the western United States and most of the eastern United States. In these areas they commonly occur in wet areas, including moist pastures, marshes, most trails, and roadsides.

Life cycle
There are two broods from May to October. During this time adults mate and lay eggs. The female will lay her eggs in bunches of up to 900 individuals on the underside of the host plant's leaves. Early-instar caterpillars eat together in a web, but later instars feed alone. They hibernate as adults, often in small congregations. Adults have been known to mate in low-elevation watercourses in arid regions.

Larval foods

 Urtica dioica – stinging nettle 
 Urtica procera – tall nettle
 Pilea pumila – clearweed

Adult foods

 Nectar 
 Thistle 
 Goldenrod
 Lilac 
 Plant sap
 Rotting fruit
 Dung

References

 

Milbert's Tortoiseshell, Butterflies of Canada

Butterflies of North America
Taxa named by Jean-Baptiste Godart
Butterflies described in 1819
Nymphalini